Mary Alice Demler (born July 8, 1964), is Miss New York 1990, a television journalist and news anchor for WGRZ in Buffalo, New York.

Biography
Maryalice Demler anchors Channel 2 News at 5:30, 6:00, 10:00, and 11:00. She joined Channel 2 in September 1993. She attended Niagara University, graduating in 1986 with a B. A. in Political Science, and a B. A. in French. She won the title of Miss New York in 1990 and participated in Miss America 1991 on September 7, 1990. On April 18, 2010, The New York Chapter of the National Academy of Television Arts and Sciences honored Demler with the New York Emmy Award for the Best News Anchor - On Camera Talent category. She is the first Buffalo-area news Anchor to receive the Best News Anchor award.
She has been the executive director of the Miss Buffalo Pageant for several years (Miss America Preliminary) and has taken her titleholders to Miss New York. She runs the Canal Fest Pageant of the Tonawandas and she ran the Miss Erie County Fair Pageant for several years. She is very involved in community service and is a journalist. She has been voted Western New York's favorite news anchor many times.   She does her hair and makeup herself before coming on air.

Demler was married to Nathan Marton from 1996 to 2013. She dated Joseph Murphy from 2018 until Murphy's unexpected death in February 2019.

References

External links

 
WGRZ's Maryalice Demler

1964 births
Living people
American television news anchors
Journalists from New York (state)
Miss New York winners
Miss America 1991 delegates
New York (state) Republicans
Niagara University alumni
Television personalities from Buffalo, New York
People from North Tonawanda, New York
American women television journalists